"Hot Girl" is an Italo disco/pop song by Italian singer Sabrina. The single was released by Baby Records in November 1987 as the album's fourth and final single. The B-side "Kiss Me" also appeared on her debut album. The song was a success in France, Switzerland, Germany and the Netherlands where it was a top 20 hit.

Song information
After the enormous success with "Boys (Summertime Love)", the team around Sabrina's manager Menzione tried to score another international hit with a new single. They chose "Hot Girl", a song from Sabrina's by-then-released first album, and had it remixed for the single release. Although Sabrina heavily promoted the song (in a Spanish TV show, she danced in such an enthusiastic way that her breasts fell out of her top), the song did not match the success of "Boys".

Formats and track listings
 7" single
 "Hot Girl" – 3:22
 "Kiss Me" – 4:05
 12" maxi
 "Hot Girl" (new version) – 6:04
 "Hot Girl" (dub version) – 7:03

Credits
 Written by Cecchetto, Bonsanto and Rossi
 Engineered by F.Santamaria and L. Vittori
 Remixed by Matteo Bonsanto and Roberto Ross
 Edited by Matteo Bonsanto and Roberto Rossi
 Executive produced by Matteo Bonsanto and Roberto Rossi
 Produced by Claudio Cecchetto

Charts

References

1987 singles
1988 singles
Sabrina Salerno songs
Songs written by Claudio Cecchetto